André Paul Guillaume Gide (22 November 1869 – 19 February 1951) was a French author awarded the 1947 Nobel Prize in Literature. Gide's career ranged from its beginnings in the symbolist movement, to the advent of anticolonialism between the two World Wars. The author of more than fifty books, at the time of his death his obituary in The New York Times described him as "France's greatest contemporary man of letters" and "judged the greatest French writer of this century by the literary cognoscenti."

Known for his fiction as well as his autobiographical works, Gide exposed to public view the conflict and eventual reconciliation of the two sides of his personality (characterized by a Protestant austerity and a transgressive sexual adventurousness, respectively), which a strict and moralistic education had helped set at odds. Gide's work can be seen as an investigation of freedom and empowerment in the face of moralistic and puritanical constraints, and centers on his continuous effort to achieve intellectual honesty. As a self-professed pederast, his self-exploratory texts reflect his search of how to be fully oneself, including owning one's sexual nature, without at the same time betraying one's values. His political activity was shaped by the same ethos, as indicated by his repudiation of communism after his 1936 journey to the USSR.

Early life

Gide was born in Paris on 22 November 1869, into a middle-class Protestant family. His father was a Paris University professor of law who died in 1880, Jean Paul Guillaume Gide, and his mother was Juliette Maria Rondeaux. His uncle was the political economist Charles Gide. His paternal family traced its roots back to Italy, with his ancestors, the Guidos, moving to France and other western and northern European countries after converting to Protestantism during the 16th century, due to persecution.

Gide was brought up in isolated conditions in Normandy and became a prolific writer at an early age, publishing his first novel, The Notebooks of André Walter (French: Les Cahiers d'André Walter), in 1891, at the age of twenty-one.

In 1893 and 1894, Gide traveled in Northern Africa, and it was there that he came to accept his attraction to boys.

He befriended Oscar Wilde in Paris, and in 1895 Gide and Wilde met in Algiers. Wilde had the impression that he had introduced Gide to homosexuality, but, in fact, Gide had already discovered this on his own.

The middle years

In 1895, after his mother's death, he married his cousin Madeleine Rondeaux, but the marriage remained unconsummated. In 1896, he became mayor of La Roque-Baignard, a commune in Normandy.

In 1901, Gide rented the property Maderia in St. Brélade's Bay and lived there while residing in Jersey. This period, 1901–07, is commonly seen as a time of apathy and turmoil for him.

In 1908, Gide helped found the literary magazine Nouvelle Revue Française (The New French Review).

During The Great War Gide visited England. One of his friends there was the artist William Rothenstein. Rothenstein described Gide's visit to his Gloucestershire home in his autobiography:

In 1916, Marc Allégret, only 15 years old, became his lover. Marc was the son – one of five children – of Élie Allégret, who years before had been hired by Gide's mother to tutor her son in light of his weak grades in school, after which he and Gide became fast friends; Élie Allégret was best man at Gide's wedding. Gide and Marc fled to London, in retribution for which his wife burned all his correspondence – "the best part of myself," he later commented. In 1918, he met Dorothy Bussy, who was his friend for over thirty years and translated many of his works into English.

Gide was close friends with the critic Charles Du Bos. Together they were part of the Foyer Franco-Belge, in which capacity they worked to find employment, food and housing for Franco-Belgian refugees who arrived in Paris following the German invasion of Belgium. Their friendship later declined, due to Du Bos' perception of Gide as disavowing or betraying his spiritual faith, in contrast to Du Bos' own return to faith. Du Bos' essay Dialogue avec André Gide was published in 1929. The essay, informed by Du Bos' Catholic convictions, condemned Gide's homosexuality. Gide and Du Bos' mutual friend Ernst Robert Curtius criticised the book in a letter to Gide, writing that "he [Du Bos] judges you according to Catholic morals suffices to neglect his complete indictment. It can only touch those who think like him and are convinced in advance. He has abdicated his intellectual liberty."

In the 1920s, Gide became an inspiration for writers such as Albert Camus and Jean-Paul Sartre. In 1923, he published a book on Fyodor Dostoyevsky; however, when he defended homosexuality in the public edition of Corydon (1924) he received widespread condemnation. He later considered this his most important work.

In 1923, he sired a daughter, Catherine, by Elisabeth van Rysselberghe, a woman who was much younger than he. He had known her for a long time, as she was the daughter of his closest female friend, Maria Monnom, the wife of his friend the Belgian neo-impressionist painter Théo van Rysselberghe. This caused the only crisis in the long-standing relationship between Allégret and Gide and damaged the relation with van Rysselberghe. This was possibly Gide's only sexual relationship with a woman, and it was brief in the extreme. Catherine became his only descendant by blood. He liked to call Elisabeth "La Dame Blanche" ("The White Lady"). Elisabeth eventually left her husband to move to Paris and manage the practical aspects of Gide's life (they had adjoining apartments built for each on the rue Vavin). She worshiped him, but evidently they no longer had a sexual relationship.

Gide's legal wife, Madeleine, died in 1938. Later he explored their unconsummated marriage in his memoir of Madeleine, Et nunc manet in te.

In 1924, he published an autobiography, If it Die... (French: Si le grain ne meurt).

In the same year, he produced the first French language editions of Joseph Conrad's Heart of Darkness and Lord Jim.

After 1925, he began to campaign for more humane conditions for convicted criminals.

Africa
From July 1926 to May 1927, he traveled through the French Equatorial Africa colony with his lover Marc Allégret. Gide went successively to Middle Congo (now the Republic of the Congo), Ubangi-Shari (now the Central African Republic), briefly to Chad and then to Cameroon before returning to France. He related his peregrinations in a journal called Travels in the Congo (French: Voyage au Congo) and Return from Chad (French: Retour du Tchad). In this published journal, he criticized the behavior of French business interests in the Congo and inspired reform. In particular, he strongly criticized the Large Concessions regime (French: Régime des Grandes Concessions), i.e., a regime that conceded part of the colony to French companies and where these companies could exploit all of the area's natural resources, in particular rubber. He related, for instance, how natives were forced to leave their village for several weeks to collect rubber in the forest, and went as far as comparing their exploitation to slavery. The book had important influence on anti-colonialism movements in France and helped re-evaluate the impact of colonialism.

Soviet Union
During the 1930s, he briefly became a communist, or more precisely, a fellow traveler (he never formally joined any communist party). As a distinguished writer sympathizing with the cause of communism, he was invited to speak at Maxim Gorky's funeral and to tour the Soviet Union as a guest of the Soviet Union of Writers. He encountered censorship of his speeches and was particularly disillusioned with the state of culture under Soviet communism, breaking with his socialist friends   in Retour de L'U.R.S.S. in 1936.

In the 1949 anthology The God That Failed Gide describes his early enthusiasm:

1930s and 1940s

In 1930 Gide published a book about the Blanche Monnier case called La Séquestrée de Poitiers, changing little but the names of the protagonists. Monnier was a young woman who was kept captive by her own mother for more than 25 years.

In 1939, Gide became the first living author to be published in the prestigious Bibliothèque de la Pléiade.

He left France for Africa in 1942 and lived in Tunis from December 1942 until it was re-taken by French, British and American forces in May 1943 and he was able to travel to Algiers where he stayed until the end of World War II. In 1947, he received the Nobel Prize in Literature "for his comprehensive and artistically significant writings, in which human problems and conditions have been presented with a fearless love of truth and keen psychological insight". He devoted much of his last years to publishing his Journal. Gide died in Paris on 19 February 1951. The Roman Catholic Church placed his works on the Index of Forbidden Books in 1952.

Gide's life as a writer

Gide's biographer Alan Sheridan summed up Gide's life as a writer and an intellectual:

"Gide's fame rested ultimately, of course, on his literary works. But, unlike many writers, he was no recluse: he had a need of friendship and a genius for sustaining it." But his "capacity for love was not confined to his friends: it spilled over into a concern for others less fortunate than himself."

Writings

André Gide's writings spanned many genres – "As a master of prose narrative, occasional dramatist and translator, literary critic, letter writer, essayist, and diarist, André Gide provided twentieth-century French literature with one of its most intriguing examples of the man of letters."

But as Gide's biographer Alan Sheridan points out, "It is the fiction that lies at the summit of Gide's work." "Here, as in the oeuvre as a whole, what strikes one first is the variety. Here, too, we see Gide's curiosity, his youthfulness, at work: a refusal to mine only one seam, to repeat successful formulas...The fiction spans the early years of Symbolism, to the "comic, more inventive, even fantastic" pieces, to the later "serious, heavily autobiographical, first-person narratives"...In France Gide was considered a great stylist in the classical sense, "with his clear, succinct, spare, deliberately, subtly phrased sentences."

Gide's surviving letters run into the thousands. But it is the Journal that Sheridan calls "the pre-eminently Gidean mode of expression." "His first novel emerged from Gide's own journal, and many of the first-person narratives read more or less like journals. In Les faux-monnayeurs, Edouard's journal provides an alternative voice to the narrator's." "In 1946, when Pierre Herbert asked Gide which of his books he would choose if only one were to survive," Gide replied, 'I think it would be my Journal.'''"  Beginning at the age of eighteen or nineteen, Gide kept a journal all of his life and when these were first made available to the public, they ran to thirteen hundred pages.

Struggle for values

"Each volume that Gide wrote was intended to challenge itself, what had preceded it, and what could conceivably follow it. This characteristic, according to Daniel Moutote in his Cahiers de André Gide essay, is what makes Gide's work 'essentially modern': the 'perpetual renewal of the values by which one lives.'" Gide wrote in his Journal in 1930: "The only drama that really interests me and that I should always be willing to depict anew, is the debate of the individual with whatever keeps him from being authentic, with whatever is opposed to his integrity, to his integration. Most often the obstacle is within him. And all the rest is merely accidental."

As a whole, "The works of André Gide reveal his passionate revolt against the restraints and conventions inherited from 19th-century France. He sought to uncover the authentic self beneath its contradictory masks."

Sexuality
In his journal, Gide distinguishes between adult-attracted "sodomites" and boy-loving "pederasts", categorizing himself as the latter.

One, but not the first, of his early sexual encounters with a young boy was in the company of Oscar Wilde. 

Gide's novel Corydon, which he considered his most important work, erects a defense of pederasty. At that time, the age of consent  for any type of sexual activity was set at thirteen.

Bibliography

 See also 
 Colonialism
 LGBT culture in Paris
 Mise en abymeReferences
Citations

Works cited
 Edmund White,  André Gide: A Life in the Present. Cambridge, MA: Harvard University Press, 1998.]

Further reading
 Noel I. Garde [Edgar H. Leoni], Jonathan to Gide: The Homosexual in History. New York:Vangard, 1964. 
 For a chronology of Gide's life, see pp. 13–15 in Thomas Cordle, André Gide (The Griffin Authors Series). Twayne Publishers, Inc., 1969.
 For a detailed bibliography of Gide's writings and works about Gide, see pp. 655–678 in Alan Sheridan, André Gide: A Life in the Present. Harvard, 1999.

External links

 Website of the Catherine Gide Foundation, held by Catherine Gide, his daughter.
 Center for Gidian Studies
 
 
 
List of Works
 
 André Gide at Goodreads
 Amis d'André Gide in French Period newspaper articles on Gide interface in French''
 André  Gide, 1947 Nobel Laureate for Literature
 André Gide: A Brief Introduction
 Gide at Maderia in Jersey, 1901–07
 

19th-century French LGBT people
1869 births
1951 deaths
Writers from Paris
French novelists
French Protestants
French travel writers
French anti-communists
French communists
French LGBT rights activists
LGBT Nobel laureates
Nobel laureates in Literature
French Nobel laureates
Writers about the Soviet Union
Modernist writers
Fyodor Dostoyevsky scholars
Lycée Henri-IV alumni
French LGBT novelists
French male essayists
French male novelists
French people of Italian descent
Anti-Stalinist left
Nouvelle Revue Française editors
20th-century French LGBT people